Stanev (female form Staneva (Станева); also appearing in the German transliteration variant Stanew) is a Bulgarian, Ukrainian and Russian surname which is derived either from Stan or Stane – both diminutives of the male given name Stanislav (with the meaning "to become glorious") – by adding the east Slavic patronymic suffix -ев (-ev). Notable people with the surname include:

 Emiliyan Stanev (1907–1979), pseudonym of Bulgarian prose writer Nikola Stoyanov Stanev
 Evgeny Stanev (born 1979), Russian judoka
 Ivan Stanev (born 1959), Bulgarian-born German author, theatre and film director 
 Mladen Stanev (born 1974), Bulgarian conductor
 Pavel Stanev (born 1986), Bulgarian football goalkeeper
 Petar Stanev (born 1975), former Bulgarian footballer
 Radostin Stanev (born 1975), former Bulgarian footballer
 Sergey Stanev (born 1988), Bulgarian footballer of Ukrainian descent
 Vesselin Stanev (born 1964), Bulgarian pianist

References 

Bulgarian-language surnames
Ukrainian-language surnames
Russian-language surnames